St George's and Priorslee is a civil parish in the district of Telford and Wrekin, Shropshire, England.  The parish contains nine listed buildings that are recorded in the National Heritage List for England.  All the listed buildings are designated at Grade II, the lowest of the three grades, which is applied to "buildings of national importance and special interest".  The parish is a suburb of the town of Telford.  Its listed buildings consist of houses and associated structures, a farmhouse, two churches, and a former cottage hospital, later used as a school.


Buildings

References

Citations

Sources

Lists of buildings and structures in Shropshire